The 19th Pennsylvania House of Representatives District is located in southwestern Pennsylvania, located within the city of Pittsburgh, and has been represented by Aerion Abney since 2022.

District profile
Pennsylvania's 19th District is located in Allegheny County and includes the following area:

Pittsburgh (part)
 Ward 01
 Ward 02 (part)
Division 01
Ward 04 (part) 
Division 01 
Division 02 
Division 17 
Division 19
Ward 05 (part) 
Division 01 
Division 02 
Division 16
Ward 15 (part) 
Divisions 13 
Division 14 
Division 15 
Division 16 
Division 17 
Division 18 
Division 19 
Ward 17 (part) 
Divisions 01 
Division 02 
Division 03 
Ward 18 (part) 
Division 02 
Division 03 
Division 04 
Division 05 
Division 06 
Division 07 
Division 08 
Division 09 
Division 10 
Division 11 
Ward 20 (part) 
Division 08 
Division 09 
Division 10 
Division 11 
Division 12 
Division 13
Ward 21 
Ward 22 
Ward 23 (part)
Division 02 
Ward 25 
Ward 26 (part) 
Division 01 
Division 02 
Division 03 
Division 04 
Division 05 
Division 06 
Division 07 
Division 08 
Division 10 
Division 11 
Division 14 
Division 16
Ward 27 (part
Division 06 
Division 09 
Division 10 
Division 11 
Division 12 
Division 13 
Ward 30

Representatives

References

External links
http://www.legis.state.pa.us/cfdocs/legis/home/member_information/house_bio.cfm?id=1026

Government of Allegheny County, Pennsylvania
19